Cobaltoblödite is a rare cobalt mineral with the formula Na2Co(SO4)2·4H2O. Cobaltoblödite was found in the Blue Lizard mine, San Juan County, Utah, USA, which is known for secondary uranium minerals. Cobaltoblödite occurs intimately intergrown with manganese-, cobalt- and nickel-enriched blödite and a yet another new mineral - manganoblödite. Cobaltoblödite, as suggested by its name is a cobalt-analogue of blödite. It is also analogous to changoite, manganoblödite and nickelblödite - other members of the blödite group.

Notes on chemistry
Manganoblödite is impure, containing admixtures of magnesium, manganese and nickel.

Association and origin
Besite blödite and cobaltoblödite, other minerals associated with manganoblödite include chalcanthite, gypsum, johannite, sideronatrite, a feldspar group-mineral and quartz.

References

Cobalt minerals
Sulfate minerals
Sodium minerals
Monoclinic minerals
Minerals in space group 14